Radical 12 or radical eight, meaning eight or all, is one of 23 of the 214 Kangxi radicals that are composed of two strokes. "八" is two bent lines that signal divide. Eight is the single-digit number that can be divided by two the greatest number of times.

In the Kangxi Dictionary, there are 44 characters (out of 49,030) to be found under this radical.

 is also the 11th indexing component in the Table of Indexing Chinese Character Components predominantly adopted by Simplified Chinese dictionaries published in mainland China.  is an associated indexing component affiliated to the principal component .

Evolution

Derived characters

Variant forms
There is a design nuance in different printing typefaces for this radical. In the Kangxi Dictionary and in Korean hanja, there is a short horizontal line at the beginning of the character's second stroke. This short line does not exist in most Simplified Chinese fonts used in mainland China, except for a few cases like the character  as in the Emblem of the People's Liberation Army. It exists in most but not all Traditional Chinese fonts. In Japanese typeface, the presence of the short line depends on each typeface's design.

The short horizontal line exists only in printing typeface, not in any handwriting form.

Literature 

Leyi Li: “Tracing the Roots of Chinese Characters: 500 Cases”. Beijing 1993, 
 KangXi:  page 126, character 26
 Dai Kanwa Jiten: character 1450
 Dae Jaweon:  page 274, character 13
 Hanyu Da Zidian:  volume 1, page 241, character 3

External links

Unihan data for U+516B

012
011